The 2019 Memphis mayoral election took place on October 3, 2019. Jim Strickland, the incumbent mayor, was elected to second term in office. The mayoral election coincided with elections to all thirteen seats on the Memphis City Council.

The election was officially nonpartisan, but all three major candidates were members of the Democratic Party.

Candidates

Declared
W. W. Herenton, former Mayor of Memphis and former Superintendent of Memphis City Schools.
Lemichael Wilson, restaurateur
Tami Sawyer, Shelby County Commissioner; Managing Director of External Affairs - Teach For America
Jim Strickland, incumbent Mayor of Memphis

Declined
Keith Norman, pastor and former chairman of the Shelby County Democratic Party
Van Turner, chairman of the Shelby County Commission
Mike Williams, president of the Memphis Police Association and candidate for mayor in 2015 (Mr. Williams has publicly defended the Memphis Police Association endorsement of Dr. Herenton

Endorsements

Campaign
Jim Strickland was elected in 2015, defeating incumbent mayor A C Wharton and becoming the first white mayor of Memphis in more than two decades. His first term was marked by a focus on economic development, the removal of Confederate statues in the city's downtown, and controversy over the police department monitoring Black Lives Matter activists.

Strickland emphasized job growth and an increase in the number of police officers on the Memphis Police Department, while Willie Herenton and Tami Sawyer criticized the city's crime rate. Sawyer emphasized a generational change in leadership and her activism surrounding the removal of Confederate statues in 2017. Strickland was seen as the candidate of the city's business class and those satisfied with the direction of Memphis, while Sawyer relied on a base of young progressive voters and Herenton's base was largely made up of older black voters.

Herenton dismissed Sawyer as "a distraction" in response to concerns that she and Herenton would split the black vote; Sawyer responded by calling Herenton a "misogynist."

Sawyer faced criticism for an old tweet that was posted to Reddit in which she ridiculed a Memphis resident for crying over their recently euthanized dog. In mid-September 2019, further controversial tweets were unearthed from Sawyer's Twitter account, including one where Sawyer seemingly gloats about outing a closeted lesbian teacher.

Throughout the campaign, Strickland led in fundraising and advertising, and he was the only candidate to air television or radio ads.

Results 
The election resulted in a decisive victory for incumbent mayor Jim Strickland, who was re-elected to a second term in office with 62% of the vote.

References

External links
Campaign websites
 Herenton campaign website
 Sawyer campaign website
 Strickland campaign website 
 Wilson campaign website 

Memphis
Mayoral elections in Memphis, Tennessee